Automatic is the eighth studio album by Scottish musician Jack Bruce, released in January 1983. It makes heavy use of the Fairlight CMI digital sampling synthesiser and Bruce is the sole performer. The album was originally only released in Germany, on the Intercord label.

Track listing

Personnel
Jack Bruce - vocals, bass, keyboards, Fairlight CMI digital sampling synthesizer, drum programming

References

Jack Bruce albums
1983 albums
Albums produced by Jack Bruce